Acıgöl (literally "the bitter lake" in Turkish) is a lake in Turkey's inner Aegean Region, in an endorheic basin at the junction between Denizli Province, Afyonkarahisar Province, and Burdur Province. Its surface area varies greatly through the seasons, with 100 km² in spring and 35 km² in late summer, with a maximum depth of 1.63 m. The lake is notable for its sodium sulfate reserves, extensively used in the industry, and Turkey's largest commercial sodium sulfate production operations are based here. It is situated 60 km east of Denizli city. From west to east, the lake's surrounding districts and towns are Bozkurt, Çardak, Dazkırı and Başmakçı.

The lake's altitude is 836 m, and it is fed primarily by high-sulfate springs issuing from a fault line on its south side. The lake is estimated to contain 12.5 million mt of sodium sulfate on the surface and in the subsurface brine, with probable total reserves of 70 million mt and possible reserves of 82 million mt. The yearly production rate in the late 1990s was 100,000 tonnes, all operated by private sector companies.

The ancient Greeks called the lake Anaua, and the ancient town near the lake was named Anaua. Historians think that the lake Ascania (Ἀσκανία) that is mentioned by Arrian is also the same lake.

References

 

Lakes of Turkey
Landforms of Afyonkarahisar Province
Landforms of Denizli Province
Landforms of Burdur Province
Important Bird Areas of Turkey